The Mouse and His Child is a 1977 animated film based on the 1967 novel of the same name by Russell Hoban.

Plot
The mouse and his child are two parts of a single small wind-up toy, which must be wound by a key in the father's back. After being unpacked, they discover themselves in a toy shop where they befriend a toy elephant and toy seal. The child mouse proposes staying at the shop to form a family, which the other toys ridicule.

They accidentally fall off the counter and end up the trash. Once transported to the dump, they become enslaved by Manny the rat, who runs a casino and uses broken wind-up toys as his slave labor force. With the aid of a psychic frog, the mice escape and meet other animals on a quest of becoming free and independent self-winding toys.

They rediscover the elephant and seal, who are somewhat broken down. Together they manage to form a family and destroy the rat empire.

Cast

Home media
The film was first released on RCA/Columbia Pictures Home Video on VHS in 1985  and re-released in 1991  in the United States. A DVD version has yet to be released in the United States, but it was released on DVD in Japan.

Reception
Janet Maslin of The New York Times praised the direction, writing and music score, but criticized the darker elements and stated that "83 minutes is a long time for an adult to think about mice".

Leonard Maltin's Movie Guide rated the movie BOMB (his lowest rating) out of four stars. He says "Boring animated film. Talk, talk, talk, and no action."

See also
Children's literature
1977 in film

References

External links

The Head of Orpheus Fan Page For Russell Hoban

1977 drama films
1977 films
American children's animated adventure films
1977 animated films
Animated films about mice
Films about sentient toys
1970s American animated films
Animated films based on novels
Animated drama films
American children's animated fantasy films
American fantasy adventure films
Japanese animated fantasy films
Japanese fantasy adventure films
1970s fantasy adventure films
1970s children's animated films
1970s English-language films